Mark Knowles and Daniel Nestor were the defending champions, but lost in the first round to Paul Goldstein and Jim Thomas.

Bob Bryan and Mike Bryan won the title, defeating Jonas Björkman and Max Mirnyi 6–1, 6–4 in the final.

Seeds

  Jonas Björkman /  Max Mirnyi (final)
  Bob Bryan /  Mike Bryan (champions)
  Mark Knowles /  Daniel Nestor (first round)
  Wayne Black /  Kevin Ullyett (semifinals)
  Leander Paes /  Nenad Zimonjić (first round)
  Michaël Llodra /  Fabrice Santoro (first round)
  Mahesh Bhupathi /  Martin Damm (third round)
  Wayne Arthurs /  Paul Hanley (third round)
  Simon Aspelin /  Todd Perry (quarterfinals)
  František Čermák /  Leoš Friedl (second round)
  Jonathan Erlich /  Andy Ram (quarterfinals)
  Cyril Suk /  Pavel Vízner (quarterfinals)
  Stephen Huss /  Wesley Moodie (first round)
  Gastón Etlis /  Martín Rodríguez (first round)
  Fernando González /  Nicolás Massú (third round)
  Lucas Arnold /  Petr Pála (first round)

Draw

Finals

Top half

Section 1

Section 2

Bottom half

Section 3

Section 4

References

External links
 Main draw
2005 US Open – Men's draws and results at the International Tennis Federation

Men's Doubles
2005 ATP Tour
US Open (tennis) by year – Men's doubles